Azusa Pacific University (APU) is a private, evangelical Christian university in Azusa, California. The university was founded in 1899, with classes opening on March 3, 1900, in Whittier, California, and began offering degrees in 1939. The university's seminary, the Graduate School of Theology, holds to a Wesleyan-Arminian doctrinal theology. APU offers more than 100 associate, bachelor's, master's, and doctoral programs on campus, online, and at seven regional locations across Southern California.

Azusa Pacific University is organized into three colleges and seven schools. The academics programs are available from the Honors College, College of Liberal Arts and Sciences, College of Music and the Arts, Leung School of Accounting, University College, School of Behavioral and Applied Sciences, School of Business and Management, School of Education, School of Nursing, and School of Theology. APU is accredited by the Western Association of Schools and Colleges (WASC).

History
Azusa Pacific University was established on March 3, 1899, in Whittier, California. Under the name Training School for Christian Workers, it was the first Bible college on the West Coast. Led by president Mary A. Hill, the school initially had a total enrollment of 12 students.

Early years saw the school relocate and change leadership several times. In 1939, Cornelius P. Haggard, Th.D., became the school's 13th president. In response to low enrollment and a lack of donations, Haggard launched a variety of fundraising efforts. Haggard served for the next 36 years.

Following mergers with three Southern California colleges, the university relocated in 1946 to the city of Azusa, where it resides today. In 1939 the Training School became Pacific Bible College, and four-year degrees were offered. In 1956, the name was changed to Azusa College. By 1965, Azusa College had become Azusa-Pacific College (APC), and three years later, APC merged with Arlington College. Upon its achievement of university status in 1981, the college changed its name to Azusa Pacific University.

After Haggard's death, Paul E. Sago, Ph.D., became president, serving until 1989. Sago encouraged the development and growth of off-site educational regional campuses throughout Southern California, and presided over the addition of master's degree programs and the development of schools within the university.

Richard E. Felix, Ph.D., became president in 1990, and initiated the university's first doctoral programs. He also introduced the university's "Four Cornerstones," Christ, Scholarship, Community, and Service, and oversaw the construction of seven new buildings, a doubling of student enrollment, and a quadrupling of graduate programs.

When nearby institution, Ambassador College closed in 1997, the Worldwide Church of God and Azusa Pacific University jointly established the Ambassador Center at Azusa Pacific University for the continuation of classes for former Ambassador College students.

In November 2000, then-Executive Vice President Jon R. Wallace, DBA, became president. In April 2018, Wallace announced his plan to retire and accepted his new role as president emeritus.

In 2017, a new independent economic study found that APU generates $1.25 billion in economic impact within California each year. Of that, APU contributes $37 million in state taxes each year and supports 7,260 jobs statewide. The report also found approximately 47,500 APU alumni reside within California, increasing the state's productivity and earning power. Of those, 10,600 APU alumni and 600 APU employees live in the San Gabriel Valley.

In 2018, two university board members resigned from the university, citing concerns over financial mismanagement and "theological drift." As of 2018, the credit rating agency Moody's had downgraded its credit rating of APU's bonds to BA1, just above junk status.

On April 10, 2019, APU named Paul W. Ferguson as its 17th president. He began his new role on June 3, 2019.

Religious affiliations 
A small group of Quakers (also known as Friends) and a Methodist evangelist laid the foundation for the Training School for Christian Workers in 1899.

As faculty members began to embrace Evangelicalism and reject a growing liberal trend in the California Yearly Meeting of Friends, a campus church was established in 1933. This shift moved the "school church" from the local Huntington Park Friends Church to the on-campus worship gathering. The new campus church planted eight "tabernacles" throughout California which collectively became known as the Evangel Church denomination.

The series of college mergers and campus re-locations which followed helped to solidify the school's identity as an Evangelical institution.

Presidents
The university has had a total of 18 presidents since its founding.

Academics

Azusa Pacific University academic resources include the Writing Center, Accessibility Services, Testing Services, Tutoring Services, university libraries, Math Center, Academic Success Center, and the Graduate and Professional Registrar. Special programs include the Friends Center, Honors College, Sigma Theta Tau (Iota Sigma), and the Western Conservancy of Nursing History.

University libraries and special collections
The APU libraries include the William V. Marshburn Library (East Campus), the Hugh and Hazel Darling Library (West Campus), the Stamps Theological Library (West Campus), and off-campus libraries supporting academic programs at the APU High Desert, Inland Empire, Los Angeles, Orange County, San Diego, and Murrieta locations.

A unified catalog identifies the more than 240,000 books, media items, and 1,900 periodical titles in the libraries' print collections. More than 703,000 microforms include the Library of American Civilization, Library of American Literature, The New York Times, and Educational Resources Information Center collections. The university network also provides access to more than 140 online databases, which include more than 46,000 electronic journals.

In the fall of 2009, Azusa Pacific University acquired a collection of antiquities, including five fragments of the Dead Sea Scrolls and five first-edition prints of the King James Bible.  These new acquisitions were displayed in an exhibit, Treasures of the Bible: The Dead Sea Scrolls and Beyond, in summer 2010.

Special collections of Azusa Pacific University are housed in the Thomas F. Andrews Room of the Hugh and Hazel Darling Library, located on APU's West Campus. The special collections consist of over 6,500 holdings ranging from presidential signatures to historical citrus crate labels.

Research 
Azusa Pacific University is classified among "R2: Doctoral Universities – High research activity". APU conducts its research through eight university research centers:
 Center for Academic Service-Learning and Research
 Center for Research on Ethics and Values (CREV)
 Center for Research in Science (CRIS)
 El Centro Teológico Hispano
 Friends Center
 Center for Vocational Ministry (Undergraduate)
 Office of Faith Integration
 Noel Academy for Strengths-Based Leadership and Education

APU's Office of Institutional Research and Assessment provides resources, training, and consultations designed to help academic and student life departments successfully assess their educational effectiveness. The office also coordinates and facilitates the academic program review process.

Honors College 
APU's Honors College was launched in 2013, with David L. Weeks as dean. An Oxford-style, writing-intensive program, the Honors College grants graduates a second major or minor in Honors Humanities and an honors scholar diploma designation. The program content replaces all general education courses. The Honors College describes its purpose as "liberally educat[ing] the next generation of intellectually-gifted Christian leaders." Students study classic literature including works by Aristotle, Shakespeare, and C.S. Lewis, and are given publication and regional/national presentation opportunities.

Campus

The university also maintains a Los Angeles Regional Site, a Monrovia Regional Site, and five additional off-site regional centers in Southern California:
 Inland Empire Regional Center (San Bernardino)
Murrieta Regional Center
San Diego Regional Center
 High Desert Regional Center (Victorville)
 Orange County Regional Center (Orange)

Athletics

The Azusa Pacific athletic teams are called the Cougars. The university is a member of the Division II level of the National Collegiate Athletic Association (NCAA), primarily competing in the Pacific West Conference (PacWest) for most of its sports since the 2012–13 academic year; while its women's swimming & diving team competes in the Pacific Collegiate Swim and Dive Conference (PCSC) and its women's water polo team competes in the Golden Coast Conference (GCC). The Cougars previously competed in the Golden State Athletic Conference (GSAC) of the National Association of Intercollegiate Athletics (NAIA) from 1986–87 to 2011–12. On July 11, 2011 Azusa Pacific began the three-year transition process to becoming a member of the NCAA. Azusa Pacific University decided to end its football program in December 2020 due to financial restructuring.

Azusa Pacific competes in 16 intercollegiate varsity sports: Men's sports include baseball, basketball, cross country, soccer, tennis and track & field; while women's sports include acrobatics and tumbling, basketball, cross country, soccer, softball, swimming & diving, tennis, track & field, volleyball, water polo.

Azusa Pacific Athletics achieved eight consecutive wins of the Directors’ Cup from 2005 to 2012, with a total of 108 GSAC Championships and 36 NAIA National Championships.  Since joining NCAA Division II, the program has added 31 PacWest Conference Championships and four GNAC championships in football.

Achievements and alumni 
A past eight-time winner of the NAIA's Directors' Cup, APU finished 17th for the second consecutive year in the 2015–16 NCAA Division II Directors' Cup standings. A total of 14 APU athletes have competed in the Olympics, including 2008 decathlon gold medalist Bryan Clay '03, and 50 other alumni have been drafted into other professional sports, including Christian Okoye '87, former Kansas City Chiefs fullback; Stephen Vogt '07, Atlanta Braves catcher; Kirk Nieuwenhuis '08, Long Island Ducks outfielder; and Terrell Watson '15, San Diego Fleet running back. Several graduates have gone onto serve as leaders in higher education including J. David Carlson, Jeff Siemers, and Jacob Amundson.

Student body

Azusa Pacific University's 2018-19 enrollment consisted of 10,095 students, of whom 5,021 are at the undergraduate and 5,074 at the graduate and professional levels. As of 2018, 58 countries, 57 states (and US territories), and 56 Christian denominations are represented by the student population. Approximately 68% of students are female and 32% are male.

In the 2018–2019 academic year, the freshman retention rate was 84%.

The university's most popular programs are in following categories:

 Health Professions and Related Programs (31%)
 Business, Management, Marketing, and Related Support Services (14%)
 Psychology (12%)
 Visual and Performing Arts (8%)
 Education (6%)

Student life 
APU features 20 music ensembles, 11 intramural sports, and about 40 clubs and organizations, including ethnic organizations, performing arts clubs, social clubs, service clubs, academic clubs, athletic clubs, and honors societies, as well as a Student Government Association. The university also hosts military and veteran services, including active duty military and veteran benefits, scholarships, and programs.

Music ensembles 
Music ensemble offerings include choral ensembles, vocal groups, large ensembles, chamber ensembles, commercial ensembles, and orchestral groups. Music groups require an audition, and perform at local churches as well as state and national orchestral and symphonic events. In addition to these ensembles, the Artist Certificate program offers a conservatory style experience to the School of Music's highest performing musicians.

Student Government Association 
APU's Student Government Association (SGA) is composed of 28 students. The SGA has served APU since 1945 by meeting with offices on campus and conducting surveys that analyze the needs of the APU student body. The SGA's governing structure, listed from highest position to lowest, is composed of a president, five executives, two commissioners, nine senators, and nine representatives.

Military and veteran services 
APU is a Yellow Ribbon University recognized by Military Friendly as a military-friendly college, and is an approved degree-granting institution recognized by the U.S. Department of Veterans Affairs. APU was also named as one of 130 "Best for Vets Colleges 2017" in the 4-year schools category by Military Times.

The university provides an ROTC program which includes scholarships and tuition assistance.

APU also offers a Veterans Club intended to create a network for veterans transitioning into academic life. The club hosts regular meetings and community service opportunities.

Diversity 
In 2016, APU was recognized by Diverse Issues in Higher Education as one of the nation's top schools in awarding degrees to minority students. The university ranked among the top 100 in 11 baccalaureate categories, and ranked 5th for awarding Hispanic master's degrees in the "business/commerce, general" category, and 55th for total minority master's degrees awarded across all disciplines. APU is recognized by the Hispanic Association of Colleges and Universities as one of 104 Hispanic-Serving Institutions in California.

LGBT prohibition 

The university has cited its Christian faith in its student code of conduct to prohibit students from "engag[ing] in a romanticized same-sex relationship." The ban has been lifted and reinstated a number of times and has been the target of student protests.

As of 2022, University policy states that "God-given sexuality" is heterosexual only.

The Student Center for Reconciliation and Diversity 
The Student Center for Reconciliation and Diversity administers scholarship programs and provides information on internship and scholarship opportunities offered by local community organizations. SCRD also advises campus ethnic organizations, including the Armenian Student Association, Asian Pacific American Student Organization, Black Student Association, Latin American Student Association, Indigenous Peoples Circle, and the Pacific Islander Organization. In addition, SCRD coordinates a Multi-Ethnic Leadership Scholarship Program.

Center for Diversity, Equity, and Inclusive Excellence 
The Center for Diversity, Equity, and Inclusive Excellence hosts initiatives including staff and faculty diversity network luncheons, diversity ambassador training, and diversity workshops. The center also facilitates a diversity plan based on a 2016 UCLA Climate Study conducted by the Higher Education Research Institute assessing APU's social climate. The center collaborates with the Council of Christian Colleges & Universities on national diversity-related projects.

Service and outreach
For eight consecutive years, Azusa Pacific has been named to the President's Higher Education Community Service Honor Roll for exemplary leadership in civic engagement, service-learning, and building community partnerships. Azusa Pacific University, as one of 115 U.S. institutions named to the Carnegie Foundation's 2010 Community Engagement Classification, is recognized for its commitment to community service and service-learning. Through APU's Center for Student Action, undergraduates perform more than 165,000 hours of service each year locally and globally.

Local service 
Local service is conducted by the City Links program, where students aid the city of Azusa and greater Los Angeles area. Services include assisting food banks and providing after school tutoring and mentoring. In addition to these weekly service opportunities, students can spend a semester living and learning in Los Angeles through L.A. Term.

Mexico Outreach 
APU students serve in Mexico through the Mexico Outreach Program, which continues a more-than-40-year relationship with churches, refugee shelters, prisons, and rehabilitation centers. Several opportunities exist throughout the year for students to serve the Mexicali community. APU also maintains a site in Ensenada–Rancho El Refugio–that is available throughout the year for students to stay at while conducting outreach in the area.

Global relief 
The Center for Student Action sends more than 250 students, faculty, staff, and alumni around the world to partner with long-term and national workers. Programs include but are not limited to: educational development, orphan work, conversational English teaching, prayer ministry, mobile medical care clinics, and anti-human and anti-sex trafficking. The following are relief efforts that the Center for Student Action has worked toward mobilizing aid and volunteers:
 Hurricane Katrina, August 2005, USA
 Cyclone Sidr, November 2006, Bangladesh
 Earthquake, 2010, Haiti
 Earthquake and Tsunami, 2011, Japan
 Typhoon Haiyan, 2013, Philippines
Hurricane Harvey, 2017, USA
 Southern California fires, various years, USA

Notable alumni

References

External links

 
 Official athletics website
 

 
Seminaries and theological colleges in California
Nondenominational Christian universities and colleges
Universities and colleges affiliated with the Wesleyan Church
Universities and colleges affiliated with the Church of God (Anderson, Indiana)
Educational institutions established in 1899
Schools accredited by the Western Association of Schools and Colleges
Universities and colleges in Los Angeles County, California
Private universities and colleges in California
San Gabriel Valley
Evangelicalism in California
1899 establishments in California
Council for Christian Colleges and Universities
Universities and colleges formed by merger in the United States